Arnold of Altena, count of Altena, count of Isenberg and Hövel, Vogt of Werden (1166–1209) was a son of Eberhard IV of Berg. He inherited the north-western territorium of Altena, and became 1st count of Isenberg in 1200.
He married Mathilde countess of Cleve daughter of Dietrich III, Count of Cleves and Adelaide of Sulzbach (+12.2.1189). Mathilde's brother was count Diederick IV of Cleve (+1193) who married in 1182 Mechteld (Margaret) of Holland (died after 1203).

Count Arnold of Altena – Isenberg and Mathilde countess of Cleve had issue:

 Eberhard II count of Altena and Isenberg (born 1180, died 1209)
 Friedrich II of Isenberg, count of Altena and Limburg-Isenberg (beheaded at Cologne 13 November 1226);
 Dietrich of Altena, (born before 1180, died on the way back from Rome to Limburg 18 July 1226);
 Engelbert of Altena, (1224-deposed 1226 following his implication in Engelbert II of Berg's assassination, rehabilitated 1238-1250) (born before 1200, died 1250);
 Philipp of Altena, Propst zu Soest and Domthesaurar in Cologne (born before 1200, died 1264);
 Bruno of Altena, (1250–1258) (born before 1200, died 20 December 1258);
 Gottfried of Altena, Propst zu St. Martin and Domdechant in Münster (born before 1220, died after 1247);
 Adolf von Holte (born 1220, died before 25 January 1260), married to Elisabeth von Holte (died after 1260). They had issue:
 Heinrich von Holte, a prior in Cologne (fl. 1261/89);
 Arnold von Holte, a priest (fl. 1266);
 Wilhelm von Holte, a priest (fl. 1281);
 Mechtild von Holte, heiress of Holte and Morenhoven (died 1301), married to Gerhard von Arberg, Bggf von Köln (died 1287);
 Heilwig (fl. 1237/46), married to Wilhelm I von Horn; and
 Christina (fl. 1257), married to Albero Schalle;
 Wilhelm of Altena, also called Wilhelm of Isenberg (1223-1242). He had a son, Wilhelm (fl. 1275), married to Christina NN;
 NN, a daughter, married to Hermann of Altena.
 Agnes of Altena, a daughter, married to Christian II, Count of Oldenburg.

Literature
 Stehkamper, H.: Der Kölner Erzbischof Adolf von Altena und die deutsche Köningswahl 1195-1205. HZ Beiheft 2. 1973.
 Oediger, F.W.: Quellen Geschichte des Erzbistums Köln. Band 1. Das Bistum Köln von den Anfängen bis zum Ende des 12. Jahrhunderts, zweite Auflage Köln 1972.
 Janssen, W.: Quellen. Das Erzbistum Köln im späten Mittelalter 1191-1515, Teil 1, Köln 1995 (Geschichte des Erzbistums Köln 2, 1).
 Kraus, T.R.: Die Entstehung der Landesherrschaft der Grafen von Berg bis zum Jahre 1225, Neustadt an der Aisch 1981
 Andernach, N.: Entwicklung der Grafschaft Berg, in: Land im Mittelpunkt der Mächte. Die Herzogtümer Jülich-Kleve-Berg, Kleve 1984, S. 63-73.
 Holdt, U,: Die Entwicklung des Territoriums Berg (Karte und Beiheft V/16 = Geschichtlicher Atlas der Rheinlande, Lieferung 11), Bonn 2008.
 Boer, de D.E.P. and Cordfunke, E.H.P.: Graven van Holland. Publisher Walburg pers. ISBN 978-90-5730-728, 
 Bleicher, W. 1976-2012: County of Limburg Lenne. Historian and Editor: Hohenlimburger Heimatblätter. Monatsschrift des Vereins für Orts- und Heimatkunde Hohenlimburg e.V.Jahrgang 1976 bis zu 2012
 Aders, G.: Die Grafen (von Limburg) und die Herrn von Limburg-Styrum aus dem Haus Berg-Altena-Isenberg. Zeitschift 'Der Marker" 1956 blad 7.
 Korteweg, K.N.: Decendants of Dietrich I Graf von Limburg Hohenlimburg. De Nederlandse Leeuw Jaargang LXXXI no.8 August 1964. 
 Berg, A.; Lineage counts of Limburg Hohenlimburg and Lords of Limburg-Styrum. Archive fur Sippenforschung Heft 14. Jahrgang 30. Mai 1964.

Counts of Germany
House of Berg
Counts of Limburg
House of Limburg-Stirum
1166 births
1209 deaths